The Violin Concerto in A major, P. 49, is the first violin concerto by the Italian composer Ottorino Respighi, which he abandoned in 1903. In 2009, Salvatore Di Vittorio completed it.

Instrumentation
The concerto is scored for two flutes, two oboes, two clarinets in A, two bassoons, four horns in F, two trumpets in A, timpani and strings.

Movements
The concerto is in three movements:

The second movement is played attacca to the first.

Duration is approximately 21 minutes.

History 
The concerto was left unfinished by Respighi in 1903, probably due to his focus on other projects. The work pre-dates the composer's other completed violin concertos: Concerto all'antica in A minor (1908), Concerto gregoriano (1921), and the single movement Poema Autunnale (1925). 

The work is mostly inspired by the violin concertos and other orchestral compositions of Johannes Brahms, Antonio Vivaldi, Felix Mendelssohn, Pyotr Ilyich Tchaikovsky and Max Bruch. The middle movement is inspired by the music of Claude Debussy. The influence of Respighi's teacher, Nikolai Rimsky-Korsakov, is also apparent.

Respighi had completed the first two movements of the concerto, and left the introduction of a third movement in piano reduction, with only a few measures orchestrated. In 2007, Respighi's descendants in collaboration with Respighi archive curator/cataloguer Potito Pedarra invited composer/conductor Salvatore Di Vittorio to complete the concerto and edit other early Respighi works, for publication in Italy. Using the autograph manuscripts, Di Vittorio has edited the first two movements, orchestrated the extant (pianoforte) introduction of the third movement, and then completed the concerto following Respighi's vision using rondo form. 

Respighi's first Violin Concerto in A major foreshadows his later violin concertos and other orchestral works, including Pines of Rome and Trittico Botticelliano.

World premiere and recording 
The concerto received its world premiere with the Chamber Orchestra of New York under conductor Salvatore Di Vittorio on February 13, 2010 at the Church of St. Jean Baptiste in New York. The concerto was recorded for Naxos Records (8.572332).

Publisher 
This work was published in 2009 by Edizioni Panastudio in Italy.

References

External links
 Ottorino Respighi.it 
 Gruppo Editoriale Panastudio 
 Chamber Orchestra of New York "Ottorino Respighi"
 Official website of Salvatore Di Vittorio
 Naxos Records

Respighi A
Concertos by Ottorino Respighi
Respighi
Musical compositions completed by others
1903 compositions
2009 compositions
Compositions in A major